Kamaluddin Ahmed (15 April 1939 – 10 June 2014), FPAS, was a Pakistani particle physicist and a professor of physics at the Quaid-e-Azam University.

Early life and career
Kamaluddin Ahmed was born in Delhi, British India in 1939. He completed his Ph.D degree from London University in 1966.

Ahmed worked for the Pakistan Atomic Energy Commission (PAEC) beginning in 1962 and remained associated with Pakistan Institute of Nuclear Science & Technology (PINSTECH) until 1967. Beginning in 1966, he studied at the University of London under Abdus Salam and Paul Taunton Matthews. He served as an advisor in Physics department at COMSATS Institute of Information Technology from 2002 to 2013.

He taught physics at Quaid-e-Azam University for over 30 years starting in December 1967 and retiring in April 1999, performed research at the Joint Institute for Nuclear Research in Dubna, and was a Fellow of the Alexander von Humboldt Foundation from 1974–75.

Honours
Kamaluddin Ahmed was elected as a fellow of the Pakistan Academy of Sciences in 2002, and in 1979 and 1983 was invited to suggest nominations for the Nobel Prize in Physics. He also served as a senior research associate member with the Abdus Salam International Centre for Theoretical Physics beginning in 1991, and as president of the Pakistan Physics Society.

Awards and recognition  
 Pride of Performance Award by the President of Pakistan in 2001.

Death and legacy
Ahmed died of hepatitis on 10 June 2014, while visiting relatives in the United States. A conference was held in his honor at the COMSATS Institute of Information Technology on 27 June 2014 to pay tribute to him. The event was attended by many physicists and members of the scientific community.

References

1939 births
2014 deaths
Muhajir people
People from Delhi
Scientists from Islamabad
People from Lahore
University of the Punjab alumni
Pakistani physicists
Project-706 people
Fellows of Pakistan Academy of Sciences
Alumni of the University of London
Academic staff of Hamdard University
Academic staff of Quaid-i-Azam University
Deaths from hepatitis
Recipients of the Pride of Performance
Nuclear weapons scientists and engineers